"Outlines" is a song recorded by Dutch record producer and DJ Mike Mago and Canadian synthpop group Dragonette. It was released as a single on 29 August 2014 by Spinnin' Records.

Music video
The music video for "Outlines" premiered on 15 August 2014. The video shows a blurred young woman in a leotard dancing inside of an abandoned building. While the woman dances, she produces outlines of herself that show her previous dance moves.

Track listings
Digital download
"Outlines" – 4:33

Digital download (Radio Edit)
"Outlines" (Radio Edit) – 2:56

Canadian digital download
"Outlines" – 4:33
"Outlines" (Radio Edit) – 2:56

Digital download (The Remixes)
"Outlines" (Redondo Remix) – 6:14
"Outlines" (Richie Romano Remix) – 4:00
"Outlines" (Shapes Remix) – 6:53

Dutch digital EP (The UK Remixes)
"Outlines" (Chris Lorenzo Remix) – 6:16
"Outlines" (Cyantific Remix) – 4:28
"Outlines" (Steve Smart Remix) – 4:33
"Outlines" (Zoo Station Remix) – 5:28

UK digital download (Radio Edit)
"Outlines" (Radio Edit) – 3:04

UK digital EP (Remixes)
"Outlines" (Cyantific Remix) – 4:28
"Outlines" (Chris Lorenzo Remix) – 6:16
"Outlines" (Zoo Station Remix) – 5:28
"Outlines" (Steve Smart Remix) – 4:33
"Outlines" (Richie Romano Remix) – 4:00
"Outlines" (Extended Mix) – 4:17

German digital EP (Remixes)
"Outlines" (Radio Edit) – 2:57
"Outlines" (Richie Romano Remix) – 3:58
"Outlines" (Shapes Remix) – 6:53
"Outlines" (Instrumental) – 4:32

Digital download (Zonderling Remix)
"Outlines" (Zonderling Remix) – 3:47

Charts

Weekly charts

Year-end charts

Certifications

Release history

References

2014 singles
2014 songs
Dragonette songs
Spinnin' Records singles
Songs written by Matt Schwartz
Songs written by Martina Sorbara